Britney 2.0 is an extended play (EP) by the cast of the musical television series Glee. It contains eight songs from the season four Glee episode of the same name, "Britney 2.0", which was the second tribute episode dedicated to American pop singer Britney Spears. The EP is composed of six songs and two mash-ups of Spears songs from her debut album ...Baby One More Time up to her seventh studio album Femme Fatale. The EP was only released digitally.

Chart performance
The EP debuted at number one on the Billboard Top Soundtracks Album chart and at number forty-three on the Billboard 200.

Track listing

Personnel

Rafael Akinyemi - composer
Tiffany Amber - composer
Adam Anders – arranger, engineer, producer, soundtrack producer, vocals
Marcella Araica - composer
Jacob Artist - vocals
Melissa Benoist - vocals
Justin Bieber - composer
Nikesha Briscoe - composer
Darren Criss - vocals
Desmond Child - composer
Peer Åström – engineer, mixing, producer
Geoff Bywater – executive in charge of music
Dante Di Loreto – executive producer
Jörgen Elofsson - composer
Brad Falchuk – executive producer
Lukasz Gottwald - composer
Nate Hills - composer
Keri Hilson - composer
Chad Hugo - composer
Mathieu Jomphe - composer
Samuel Larsen - vocals
David Kreuger - vocals

Mason Levy - composer
Per Magnusson - composer
Max Martin - composer
Kevin McHale - vocals
Bonnie McKee - composer
Lea Michele - vocals
Heather Morris - vocals
Ryan Murphy – producer, soundtrack producer
Matthew Musto - composer
Alex Newell - vocals
Chord Overstreet - vocals
Joe Perry - composer
Ryan Peterson – engineer
Mike Posner - composer
Rami - composer
Shellback - composer
Annette Stamatelatos - composer
Britney Spears - composer
Steven Tyler - composer
Jenna Ushkowitz - vocals
James Washington - composer
Pharrell Williams - composer

References

2012 EPs
Glee (TV series) albums
Columbia Records EPs
Britney Spears
Tribute albums

Britney Spears tribute albums